Joanne Meryl Bradshaw, OAM (born 8 November 1961) is an Australian Paralympic athlete. She was born in the Victorian town of Yallourn,. She has one daughter, Paige. At the 1998 IPC Athletics World Championships in Birmingham, she won silver medals in the women's shot put and women's discus and a bronze medal in the women's javelin. She won a gold medal at the 2000 Sydney Games in the women's shot put F37 event, in the process setting a new Paralympic record. She received a Medal of the Order of Australia for her 2000 gold medal. She competed but did not win any medals at the 2004 Athens Games.

References

External links
Joanne Bradshaw - Athletics Australia Results

Paralympic athletes of Australia
Athletes (track and field) at the 2000 Summer Paralympics
Athletes (track and field) at the 2004 Summer Paralympics
Paralympic gold medalists for Australia
Recipients of the Medal of the Order of Australia
Sportswomen from Victoria (Australia)
Cerebral Palsy category Paralympic competitors
Track and field athletes with cerebral palsy
1961 births
Living people
Medalists at the 2000 Summer Paralympics
People from Yallourn
Paralympic medalists in athletics (track and field)
Australian female discus throwers
Australian female javelin throwers
Australian female shot putters